The Federal High Court of Nigeria (FHC) is one the Federal superior Courts  of record in Nigeria. It has coordinate jurisdiction with the  High Courts of the States of the Federation, including FCT and is located in Shehu Shagari Way, Central District Abuja.

Overview 
The Federal High Court was formerly called the Federal Revenue Court and was established by the Federal Revenue Act of 1973. However, by virtue of section 228(1) and 230 (2) of the 1979 Constitution of the Federal Republic of Nigeria, it was renamed, Federal High Court. The Federal High Court has both criminal and civil jurisdiction over matter instituted before it pursuant to section 251 of the 1999 Constitution of the Federal Republic of Nigeria (as amended).

Structure and Organization 
The Federal High Court is composed of the Chief Judge and such number of judges  as may be prescribed by an Act of the National Assembly. Judges of the FHC are appointed by the President on the recommendation of the National Judicial Council, and subject to confirmation by the Senate. To qualify for the post of a Chief Judge or judges of the Federal High Court, such a person must have been qualified to practice law in Nigeria, and must have been so qualified for a period not less than ten years.  The retirement age for Judges of the Federal High Court of Nigeria is 65 years.

As at December, 2021, the total number of Federal High Court judges in the country stood at 75. Meanwhile, the total number of cases across the various judicial division was 128,000

List of Judicial Divisions 
Although, the court is headquartered in Federal Capital Territory, Abuja, it has several judicial divisions around the country.

 Federal High Court, Abuja (Headquarters)
 Federal High Court, Abakaliki
 Federal High Court, Abeokuta
 Federal High Court, Akure
 Federal High Court, Ado- Ekiti
 Federal High Court, Awka
 Federal High Court, Asaba
 Federal High Court, Bauchi
 Federal High Court, Yenegao
 Federal High Court, Benin
 Federal High Court Calabar
 Federal High Court, Damaturu
 Federal High Court, Dutse
 Federal High Court, Enugu
 Federal High Court, Gombe
 Federal High Court, Ibadan
 Federal High Court, Ikeja
 Federal High Court, IIorin
 Federal High Court, Jos
 Federal High Court, Kaduna
 Federal High Court, Kano
 Federal High Court, Lafia
 Federal High Court, Lagos
 Federal High Court, Maiduguri
 Federal High Court, Markurdi
 Federal High Court, Minna
 Federal High Court, Oshogbo
 Federal High Court, Port Harcourt
 Federal High Court, Owerri
 Federal High Court, Sokoto
 Federal High Court, Umuahia

References 

Law of Nigeria
Government of Nigeria
Politics of Nigeria
Judiciary of Nigeria
1979 establishments in Nigeria
Courts and tribunals established in 1979